Monywa Stadium is a multi-use stadium in Monywa, Myanmar.  It is currently used mostly for football matches and is the home ground of Sagaing United F.C. of the Myanmar National League.  The stadium has a capacity of 5,000 spectators.

References

External links
 Stadium information

Football venues in Myanmar